The Norwegian royal families are the families of either previous or present Norwegian monarchs. The current family who holds the throne are members of the House of Glücksburg and ascended the throne after the election of Prince Carl (regal name Haakon VII) during the dissolution of the Swedish-Norwegian union in 1905.

In Norway there is a distinction between the Royal House (kongehuset) and the royal family (kongelige familie). The Royal House includes only the monarch and their spouse, the heir apparent and their spouse, and the heir apparent's eldest child. The royal family includes all of the sovereign's children and their spouses, grandchildren, and siblings. The current royal family, and Royal House, maintains a high approval rating among the Norwegian people.

History 
The Norwegian monarchy traces its history and origin back to the unification and founding of Norway, as well as Norway's first king, Harald I of the Fairhair dynasty. With the introduction of the Norwegian Law of Succession in 1163, the legal framework established that only one monarch and one royal family was, through succession, allowed to rule.

Norway, Sweden and Denmark had joint monarchs during the Kalmar Union in the late Middle Ages, and Norway remained in union with Denmark after Sweden left the union in 1523. Following the reformation a joint Danish-Norwegian state was established 1536-37, which was ruled from Copenhagen by the House of Oldenburg until Norway was ceded to Sweden at the Treaty of Kiel in 1814 following Denmark-Norway's defeat in the Napoleonic Wars. Norway was briefly independent with its own king in 1814, but forced into a new union with Sweden under the rule of the House of Bernadotte.

Upon becoming independent in 1905, Norway decided through a referendum to remain as a monarchy, with its first monarch being the Danish-born King Haakon VII, whose family consisted of the British Princess Maud and their son Olav. It is King Haakon's descendants that today make up the current royal family of Norway.

Through marriages and historical alliances, the Norwegian royal family is closely related to the Swedish and Danish royal families as well as being more distantly related to royal families of Greece and the United Kingdom.

The current king Harald V descends from all of the four kings belonging to the House of Bernadotte (1818-1905) that preceded the House of Glücksburg on the throne and is the first Norwegian monarch to be a descendant of all previous Norwegian monarchs since 1818.

Members
Members of the Royal House are:

King Harald V (The Monarch) Queen Sonja (The Consort)
Crown Prince Haakon (The Crown Prince (The King's son and heir apparent))  Crown Princess Mette-Marit (The Crown Princess (The King's daughter-in-law))
Princess Ingrid Alexandra of Norway (The King's granddaughter)

Members of the Royal Family (people who are in the royal bloodline or who have become a member of the family through marriage but are not in the Royal House) are:

Prince Sverre Magnus of Norway (The King's grandson)
 Marius Borg Høiby (The King's step-grandson) 
Princess Märtha Louise of Norway (The King's daughter)
Maud Angelica Behn (The King's granddaughter)
Leah Isadora Behn (The King's granddaughter)
Emma Tallulah Behn (The King's granddaughter)
Princess Astrid, Mrs. Ferner (The King's sister)

Deceased members of the Royal Family are:

Queen Maud (The King's grandmother; died in 1938)
Crown Princess Märtha (The King's mother; died in 1954)
King Haakon VII (The King's grandfather; died in 1957)
King Olav V (The King's father; died in 1991)
Princess Ragnhild, Mrs. Lorentzen (The King's sister; died in 2012)
Johan Ferner (The King's brother-in-law; died in 2015)
Ari Behn (The King's former son-in-law, died in 2019)
Erling Lorentzen (The King's brother-in-law, died in 2021)

Family tree of members

Notes
* Member of the Royal House

Royal coat of arms
The coat of arms of Norway is one of the oldest in Europe and serves both as the coat of arms of the nation and of the Royal House. This is in keeping with its origin as the coat of arms of the kings of Norway during the Middle Ages.

Håkon the Old (1217–1263) used a shield with a lion. The earliest preserved reference to the colour of the arms is the King's Saga written down in 1220.

In 1280 King Eirik Magnusson added the crown and silver axe to the lion. The axe is the martyr axe of St. Olav, the weapon used to kill him in the battle of Stiklestad in 1030.

The specific rendering of the Norwegian arms has changed through the years, following changing heraldic fashions. In the late Middle Ages, the axe handle gradually grew longer and came to resemble a halberd. The handle was usually curved in order to fit the shape of shield preferred at the time, and also to match the shape of coins. The halberd was officially discarded and the shorter axe reintroduced by royal decree in 1844, when an authorized rendering was instituted for the first time. In 1905 the official design for royal and government arms was again changed, this time reverting to the medieval pattern, with a triangular shield and a more upright lion.

The coat of arms of the royal house as well as the Royal Standard uses the lion design from 1905. The earliest preserved depiction of the Royal Standard is on the seal of Duchess Ingebjørg from 1318. The rendering used as the official coat of arms of Norway is slightly different and was last approved by the king 20 May 1992.

When used as the royal coat of arms the shield features the insignias of the Royal Norwegian Order of St. Olav around it and is framed by a royal ermine robe, surmounted by the crown of Norway.

The royal coat of arms is not used frequently. Instead, the king's monogram is extensively used, for instance in military insignia and on coins.

See also
 Kings of Norway family tree
 Succession to the Norwegian throne
 List of Norwegian monarchs
 Monarchy of Norway

References

External links
 The Royal Family and the Royal House of Norway - Official Site of the Norwegian Royal Family (in English)
  The Royal House of Norway - Official Site of the Royal House of Norway (Entire Site in English)

Norwegian monarchy